The Journal of Combinatorial Theory, Series A and Series B, are mathematical journals specializing in combinatorics and related areas. They are  published by Elsevier. Series A is concerned primarily with structures, designs, and applications of combinatorics. Series B is concerned primarily with graph and matroid theory. The two series are two of the leading journals in the field and are widely known as JCTA and JCTB.

The journal was founded in 1966 by Frank Harary and Gian-Carlo Rota. Originally there was only one journal, which was split into two parts in 1971 as the field grew rapidly.

An electronic, open access journal, Combinatorial Theory, was announced in 2020.  The new journal aims to be a continuation of JCTA independently from Elsevier. Most of the editorial board of JCTA resigned at the end of 2020, and part of them transitioned to Combinatorial Theory. It published its first issue in December 2021.

Influential articles
Influential articles that appeared in the journal include Katona's elegant proof of the Erdős–Ko–Rado theorem and a series of papers spanning over 500 pages, appearing from 1983 to 2004, by Neil Robertson and Paul D. Seymour on the topic of graph minors, which together constitute the proof of the graph minors theorem. Two articles proving Kneser's conjecture, the first by László Lovász and the other by Imre Bárány, appeared back-to-back in the same issue of the journal.

References

Combinatorics journals
Publications established in 1966
Elsevier academic journals
English-language journals